Scanda Township is a township in Republic County, Kansas, in the United States.

History
Scandia Township was organized in 1871. It was named for the Scandinavian pioneer settlers.

References

Townships in Republic County, Kansas
Townships in Kansas
Scandinavian-American culture
Swedish-American culture in Kansas